Osbornellus is a genus of leafhoppers (family Cicadellidae). There are at least 100 described species in Osbornellus.

See also
 List of Osbornellus species

References

Further reading

External links

 

Scaphoideini
Cicadellidae genera